The Pako River is a river in Alibori Department, Benin. It is a tributary of the Alibori River.

References

Rivers of Benin
Alibori Department